The 2010 UCI Mountain Bike & Trials World Championships was the 21st edition of the UCI Mountain Bike & Trials World Championships and was held in Mont-Sainte-Anne, Quebec, Canada from 1 to 5 September 2010.

Medal summary

Men's events

Women's events

Team events

Medal table

Results

Men
Cross-country

Downhill

Women
Cross-country

Downhill

References

See also
2010 UCI Mountain Bike World Cup

 
UCI Mountain Bike World Championships
UCI Mountain Bike World Championships
2011 UCI Mountain Bike World Championships
UCI Mountain Bike World Championships
Mountain biking events in Canada
2010 in Quebec